Chaudhary Narayan Singh was served as  the first Deputy Chief Minister of Uttar Pradesh. His son Sanjay Singh Chauhan was a member of the Rashtriya Lok Dal (RLD) and a Member of Parliament representing Bijnor in Uttar Pradesh state in the 15th Lok Sabha.Shri. Sanjay Singh Chauhan was also Member of Uttar Pradesh legislative assembly from Morna/Meeranpur Constituency which was the seat of Babu Narayan Singh ji. He is still a notable Gujjar leader from Uttar Pradesh.

References

External links

Members of the Uttar Pradesh Legislative Assembly
Deputy chief ministers of Uttar Pradesh
People from Muzaffarnagar district
Chief Ministers of Uttar Pradesh